Collodiscula is a genus of fungi in the family Xylariaceae. This is a monotypic genus, containing the single species Collodiscula japonica. Collodiscula japonica'''s anamorph is Acanthodochium collodisculae''.

References

External links
Index Fungorum

Xylariales
Monotypic Ascomycota genera